Margo Goodhand is a Canadian journalist who served as the first female editor of the Winnipeg Free Press.  

Goodhand was appointed in 2007 and resigned in  2012. She was the editor-in-chief of the Edmonton Journal from 2013 to 2016.

References

Living people
Year of birth missing (living people)